1982 in Korea may refer to:
1982 in North Korea
1982 in South Korea